Lipec is a village in the municipality of Vinica, North Macedonia. It used to be part of the former municipality of Blatec.

Demographics
According to the 2002 census, the village had a total of 430 inhabitants. Ethnic groups in the village include:

Macedonians 429
Serbs 1

References

Villages in Vinica Municipality, North Macedonia